Ramón Blázquez Guerrero (born 5 March 1989) is a Spanish footballer who plays for UD Socuéllamos as a right back.

Football career
Born in Tobarra, Province of Albacete, Blázquez signed for Albacete Balompié in 2009 from CD Onda, spending almost two full seasons with the reserves. He made his first-team debut on 19 March 2011, starting in a 0–1 home loss against UD Las Palmas, and finished his first season with nine appearances as the Castile-La Mancha side suffered relegation from the Segunda División.

After loan stints in Segunda División B, with CD Leganés and Écija Balompié, Blázquez terminated his contract with Alba and joined Tercera División club CP Villarrobledo in September 2013. After featuring regularly during the campaign, he moved to La Roda CF in the third level.

References

External links
Villarrobledo official profile 

1989 births
Living people
Sportspeople from the Province of Albacete
Spanish footballers
Footballers from Castilla–La Mancha
Association football defenders
Segunda División players
Segunda División B players
Tercera División players
Atlético Albacete players
Albacete Balompié players
CD Leganés players
Écija Balompié players
La Roda CF players
UD Socuéllamos players